Claudia Riegler (born 7 July 1973 in Vienna) is a snowboarder from Austria. She competed for Austria at the 2010 Winter Olympics in parallel giant slalom, finishing seventh. Riegler later captured silver and bronze medals at the 2011 FIS Snowboarding World Championships.

She is a sister of Manuela Riegler.

References

External links
 FIS-Ski.com – Biography
 

1973 births
Living people
Austrian female snowboarders
Olympic snowboarders of Austria
Snowboarders at the 2002 Winter Olympics
Snowboarders at the 2010 Winter Olympics
Snowboarders at the 2014 Winter Olympics
Snowboarders at the 2018 Winter Olympics